Bước nhảy hoàn vũ 2012 is the forthcoming season of Bước nhảy hoàn vũ produced by Vietnam Television and Cat Tien Sa Productions based upon the BBC Worldwide's Dancing with the Stars. Thanh Bạch and Đoan Trang did not return for this season. They are replaced by host Thanh Vân from season 1 and Nguyên Vũ, season 3-second runner-up. The new cast were officially announced on February 26, 2012.

The season is scheduled to premiere on March 18, 2012. Professional Aleks and two judges Khánh Thi and Chí Anh confirmed to return.

Couples

Scoring chart 

Red numbers indicate the lowest score for each week.
Green numbers indicate the highest score for each week.
Underlined numbers indicate the favorite contestant of the week
 indicates the winning couple.
 indicates the runner-up couple.
 indicates the third-place couple.
 indicates the couple eliminated that week.
 indicates the returning couple that finished in the bottom two.
 indicates the returning couple that was the last to be called safe (they may or may have not been in the bottom two).

Highest and lowest scoring performances 
The best and worst performances in each dance according to the judges' marks are as follows:

Couples' highest and lowest scoring dances

Styles, scores and songs

Week 1 
Air date: March 18, 2012
Location: Quan Ngua Sports Palace, Hanoi
Routines:
Performers:
Fourth judge:
Guest(s):

Week 2+3 
 Week 2
Air date: March 25
Routines: Cha-Cha-Cha or Slow Waltz
Performers: Hương Trà, Đinh Mạnh Ninh, Trà My, Tô Minh Đức
Fourth judge: Nguyễn Quang Dũng
Guest(s):

Individual judges scores in charts below (given in parentheses) are listed in this order from left to right: FOURTH JUDGE – Khánh Thi – Quốc Bảo – Chí Anh. The results of the voting is combined with the ranking of the panel of judges, and the celebrities have the higher scores in total survive.

Performing order

 Week 3
Air date: April 8
Routines: Rumba or Quickstep
Performers: Hương Trà, Đinh Mạnh Ninh, Trà My, Tô Minh Đức 
Fourth judge: Nguyễn Quang Dũng
Guest(s): Siu Black (season 1), Minh Béo (season 1), Nathan Lee

Individual judges scores in charts below (given in parentheses) are listed in this order from left to right: Nguyễn Quang Dũng – Khánh Thi – Quốc Bảo – Chí Anh. The results of the voting is combined with the ranking of the panel of judges, and the celebrities have the higher scores in total survive.

Performing order

 Scores in total

Week 4 
Air date: April 15
Routines: Tango or Jive
Performers:
Fourth judge: Nguyễn Việt Tú
Guest(s):

Individual judges scores in charts below (given in parentheses) are listed in this order from left to right: Việt Tú – Khánh Thi – Quốc Bảo – Chí Anh. The results of the voting is combined with the ranking of the panel of judges, and the celebrities have the higher scores in total survive.

Performing order

Week 5 
Air date: April 22
Routines: Exhibition dances (Samba, Mambo, Salsa, Lambada)
Performers: Dương Ánh Linh, Đinh Mạnh Ninh
Fourth judge: Trần Ly Ly
Guest(s): Đinh Mạnh Ninh, Phương Vy

Individual judges scores in charts below (given in parentheses) are listed in this order from left to right: Trần Ly Ly – Quốc Bảo – Khánh Thi – Chí Anh. The results of the voting is combined with the ranking of the panel of judges, and the celebrities have the higher scores in total survive.

Performing order

Week 6 
Air date: April 29
Themes: Night of Films
Performers: Tô Minh Đức, Trà My, Đinh Mạnh Ninh, S.I.N.E group
Fourth judge: Hồ Hoài Anh
Guest(s): Hồ Hoài Anh, Lưu Hương Giang, Yến Trang

Individual judges scores in charts below (given in parentheses) are listed in this order from left to right: Hồ Hoài Anh – Khánh Thi -Quốc Bảo – Chí Anh. The results of the voting is combined with the ranking of the panel of judges, and the celebrities have the higher scores in total survive.

Performing order

Week 7 
Air date: May 20
Routines: Freestyle
Performers:
Fourth judge:
Guest(s):

Vân Trang & Vasil
32 (8,8,8,8)
 Hip Hop

Minh Quân & Nikoleta
34 (8,9,8,9)
 Cha cha cha,Samba, Salsa

Minh Hằng & Atanas
36 (9,9,9,9)
 Múa Đương Đại

Anh Thư & Teodor
34 (8,9,9,8)
 Múa Đương Đại

Nam Thành & Elena
34 (9,8,8,9)
 Múa Dân Tộc Bulgaria

Phương Thanh & Ivan
38 (9,10,9,10)
 Múa Dân Gian, Foxtrot

Week 8 
Air date: May 27
Routines:
Performers:
Fourth judge:
Guest(s):
 Anh Thư & Teodor
 Samba 
 34(9,8,8,9)

 Minh Quân & Nicoleta
 Rumba
 34 (8,8,9,9)

 Minh Hằng & Atanas
 Broadway
 38 (9,10,9,10)

 Phương Thanh & Ivan

Week 9 
Air date: June 10
Routines:
Performers:
Fourth judge:
Guest(s):

Week 10 – Finale 
Air date: June 17
Routines:
Performers:
Fourth judge:
Guest(s):

Call-out order 

 This couple came in first place with the judges.
 This couple came in last place with the judges.
 This couple came in last place with the judges and was eliminated.
 This couple was eliminated.
 This couple was audience's favorite of the week.
 This couple came in first place with the judges and gained the most vote from audience.
 This couple won the competition.
 This couple came in second in the competition.
 This couple came in third in the competition

Dance chart 
The celebrities and professional partners danced one of these routines for each corresponding week.
 Week 2: Cha-Cha-Cha or English Waltz 
 Week 3: Rumba or Quickstep
 Week 4: Tango or Jive
 Week 5: Exotic (Mambo, Samba, Salsa, or Lambada)
 Week 6: Movie theme
 Week 7: Freestyle and Viennese Waltz
 Week 8: Broadway and Salsa

 Highest scoring dance
 Lowest scoring dance
 Performed but not scored

Guest performances

References

External links 
Bước nhảy hoàn vũ's official site

Bước nhảy hoàn vũ
2010s Vietnamese television series
2012 Vietnamese television seasons